Karanjgaon is a village on the bank of river Godavari in Niphad Taluka, Nashik District.

Karanjgaon's latitude and longitude coordinates are given as 20° 4' 60" N, 74° 7' 0" E or 19° 58' 60" N, 73° 47' 60" E. The village has botanical surroundings. The population is about 7500 and the main source of income is farming.

History

Karanjgaon is the village of freedom fighter "Anna Dange"(S A Dange ), founder of the Marksvadi Communist Party.
It also has an old fort-type building called the "Jijamata Gadhi".

The village
The place becomes a pilgrimage center during the festivals of "Gudi Padva" and "Maagh Paurnima". This is the main market place for nearer village. Tuesday is the market day of the village.

There are many temples in the village such as the temples of lord Rama, Khanderao, ambimata, agnimata, and Shiv Mahadev. Various functions, e.g. "Harinam Saptah" at Hanuman and Ram temple are also carried out during specific period. In the village there is a temple of Sidhheshwar Mandir, a touring place of Karanjgaon.

References

 Karanjgaon at WikiMapia.

Villages in Nashik district